4-HO-MET (4-hydroxy-N-methyl-N-ethyltryptamine, metocin, or methylcybin), is a lesser-known psychedelic drug. It is a structural− and functional analog of psilocin as well as the 4-hydroxyl analog of methylethyltryptamine (MET). 4-HO-MET was first synthesized by Alexander Shulgin. In his book TiHKAL (Tryptamines I Have Known and Loved), the dosage is listed as 10-20 mg. 4-HO-MET produces psilocin-like distortion of color, sound, and form. Very little data exists about the pharmacological properties, metabolism, and toxicity of 4-HO-MET. There have been no reports of deaths from 4-HO-MET, even though people have reported taking doses up to 150 mg, more than an order of magnitude above the effective dose.

Effects 

Users report similar effects to psilocin, including mydriasis, closed and open eye visuals, euphoria, time dilation and general change in thought processes. These effects occur in a wavelike pattern such as that of psilocybin with near-normal perception and high effect varying rapidly. The effects last for about 4–6 hours after oral administration, and 3–4 hours after intranasal use.

Pharmacology

Pharmacodynamics

Drug prohibition laws

Sweden
Sveriges riksdag added 4-HO-MET  to schedule I ("substances, plant materials and fungi which normally do not have medical use") as narcotics in Sweden as of May 1, 2012,  published by Medical Products Agency in their regulation LVFS 2012:6 listed as 4-HO-MET 3-[2-[etyl(metyl)amino]etyl]-1H-indol-4-ol.

United Kingdom
4-HO-MET is a class A drug in the UK, as a result of the tryptamine catch-all clause.

United States
4-HO-MET is not scheduled at the federal level in the United States, but it is possible that it could be considered an analogue of psilocin, in which case purchase, sale, or possession could be prosecuted under the Federal Analogue Act.

Germany
4-HO-MET is ruled under the Neue-psychoaktive-Stoffe-Gesetz (NpSG) since July 18, 2019. Production and Import with intent to distribute is punishable. Possession is forbidden but not punishable, although ordering it in small quantities can still be seen as an intent to distribute it and be punished.

See also 
 Psychedelics, dissociatives and deliriants
 4-HO-DET

References 

Psychedelic tryptamines
Phenols
Designer drugs